Gosnells is a suburb located within the City of Gosnells. It contains the Gosnells town centre which includes the Council offices,  library and the Gosnells Railway Station.

History 
The area where Gosnells is located was used by the Nyoongar Aboriginal people for thousands of years before European settlement. In 1829, when the European settlers arrived in Western Australia, farms were established along the Swan and Canning Rivers, significantly changing the landscape and terrain of Gosnells. In 1862, Charles Gosnell of London purchased the surrounding lands of Gosnells from the Davis Family. In 1890, Western Australia experienced an influx of residents from overseas and interstate due to the gold rush in Kalgoorlie and Coolgardie. This resulted in an increased demand for land on the outskirts of Perth and subsequently a group of developers bought the land (named "Canning Location 16") from the deceased estate of Gosnell. In 1907, the name "Gosnells" was adopted for the area.

Since 2000, government investment in the declining town centre has included new Council offices, a library and civic centre, the relocation of the Gosnells train station and the acquisition of blighted commercial properties. These projects have led to a revitalisation of commercial activity and a decline in crime and anti-social behaviour.

Transport

Rail 
Gosnells is served by Gosnells and Seaforth railway stations. These stations are on the suburban Perth to Armadale railway line, with trains departing approximately every 15 minutes to the city. Train services are more frequent during peak periods, with trains departing approximately every 5 to 10 minutes. These services are operated by the state-owned public transport company, Transperth. It takes approximately 23 minutes to travel from Gosnells to Perth by train.

Road 
Albany Highway is the main link to Gosnells from the Perth central business district, and carries traffic northwest into the city, or southeast to Albany.

Bus 
Gosnells has six bus routes, the 210, 211, 220, 228, 231 and the 232.
The 210 and 211 goes to Thornlie.
The 228 goes to Thornlie, via Maddington.
The 231 and 232 goes around Gosnells, also known as the "Gosnells Loop".
The 220 from Armadale travel to Gosnells from Perth.

Climate

Gosnells has a Mediterranean climate (Köppen climate classification Csa), like the rest of Perth.

Notable residents
 Gerald Arthur - cricketer
 Chris Tallentire - politician
 Mitch Wishnowsky - American football player

References

External links

Suburbs in the City of Gosnells
1890 establishments in Australia
Suburbs of Perth, Western Australia